Jarabulus Subdistrict  is a subdistrict of Jarabulus District in Aleppo Governorate of northern Syria. The administrative centre is the city of Jarabulus.

At the 2004 census, the subdistrict had a population of 64,758.

Cities, towns and villages

References 

Jarabulus District
Jarabulus